Earl Alexander may refer to:

Earl Alexander of Tunis, a title created in 1952 for Harold Alexander, 1st Viscount Alexander of Tunis
Earl Alexander of Hillsborough (1885–1965), a title created in 1963 for A. V. Alexander, 1st Viscount Alexander of Hillsborough
Earl Alexander (actor), an actor noted for his voice work in the Left 4 Dead series